The Regius Professorship of Laws is a professorship at Trinity College Dublin (TCD), the only constituent college of Dublin University. It is one of the oldest chairs  there, having been founded in 1668. Professor Mark Bell has held the post since July 2015.

History of the Chair
In the founding charter of TDC, Elizabeth I granted the university the right to award degrees in omnibus artibus et facultatibus, including law. There were no other ways to train legally in Ireland until the mid-19th century. Even in early regulations, there was a professor of civil law who was responsible for the exams and the training standards. Before 1668, the teaching of jurisprudence was under the control of the university administration. One of the Fellows taught law for one semester. There was no permanent professorship.

The first mention of a publicly appointed professor is on 20 November 1667, when Henry Styles was appointed the first publ. Prof. Legum. By a letter of 
Charles II. On 4 November 1668, a professorship was newly established as the Regius Professor of Civil and Canon Law and supported with funds from the Act of Settlement with 40 pounds sterling per year.

Down through the centuries, the chair of  Civil and Canon Law was usually occupied by a fellow from the college, a practice that was expressly prohibited, for example, in the Chair of Feudal and English Law (which was founded in 1761). When this latter chair came to require written examination regulations in the mid-19th century, the civil law chair was reformed at the same time, the salary was increased and the practice of appointing a fellow was abandoned. From then on, the professor had to be a doctor of law, a barrister with at least six years of professional experience. In 1871 it was even stipulated that a fellow appointed professor had to give up his fellowship.

Nevertheless, the chair was just a sinecure for many of the holders. Notable exceptions were people such as Francis Stoughton Sullivan, who later became the first Regius Professor of Feudal and English Law, or Arthur Brown, who also campaigned politically for the goals of the university.

It was not until the mid-19th century that the division of responsibilities between the Regius Professor of Laws (Roman law, general law and international law) and that of Feudal and English Law (property law) made the chair a permanent first-class position in university teaching. In 1944, Frances Elizabeth Moran took over the chair, becoming the first woman in Ireland (or indeed Britain) to be a professor in law To date, no other woman had been appointed to a Regius Professorship of Laws at TCD.

List of Regius Professors of Laws

Regius Professors of Laws since its founding in 1688 include:

 Henry Styles, 1668
 George Brown, 1686
 John Barton, 1693
 Benjamin Pratt, 1704
 John Elwood, 1710
 Robert Shawe, 1740
 John Forster, 1743
 Brabazon Disney, 1747
 John Whittingham, 1749
 Francis Stoughton Sullivan, 1750
 Patrick Duigenan, 1766
 Michael Kearney, 1776
 James Drought, 1778
 Henry Joseph Dabzac, 1779
 John Forsayeth, 1782
 Gerald FitzGerald, 1783
 Arthur Browne, 1785
 Francis Hodgkinson, 1806
 Robert Phibbs, 1808  
 Richard Graves, 1809 
 Francis Hodgkinson, 1810 
 Christopher Edmund Allen, 1817
 Richard MacDonnell, 1840
 Henry Wray, 1841
 John Lewis Moore, 1844
 John Anster, 1850
 Thomas E. Webb, 1867
Henry Brougham Leech, 1888
Charles Francis Bastable, 1908, retired 1932
Vacant, 1932–34
Samuel Lombard Brown, 1934
Vacant, 1939–44
 Frances Elizabeth Moran, 1944
Vincent Thomas Hyginus Delany, 1963
 John Desmond Morton, 1965
 Charles Beuno McKenna, 1966
 Robert Heuston, 1970
 Paul O'Higgins, 1984 
 William Binchy, 1992
 Mark Bell, 2015

List of Regius Professors of Feudal and English Law (1761–1934)
In 1761, a second Regius Professorship was introduced by George III, the Regius Chair of Feudal and English Law.  This chair would be continuously occupied until it was discontinued in 1934 and replaced by The Professorship of Laws.
 Francis Stoughton Sullivan, 1761
 Patrick Palmer, 1766
 Patrick Duigenan, 1776
 Philip Cecil Crampton, 1816
 Samuel Mountifort Longfield, 1834
 Edmund Thomas Bewley, 1884
George Vaughan Hart, 1891
James Sinclair Baxter, 1909–33

References

1668 establishments in Ireland
Professorships at Trinity College Dublin
Professorships in law
Laws Dublin